Illinois Route 169 is an east–west state road in far southern Illinois. It runs from Illinois Route 37 north of Grand Chain east to U.S. Route 45 east of Boaz.

Route description 
Illinois 169 is the southernmost main arterial route between Illinois 37 and U.S. 45. It is also the southernmost east–west state route in Illinois. Illinois 169 is a two-lane surface road for its entire length.

History 
SBI Route 169 originally ran from Shelbyville to Dalton City on what is now Illinois Route 128. It was moved to its current route in 1949.

Major intersections

References

External links

169
Transportation in Pulaski County, Illinois
Transportation in Massac County, Illinois